Rotary Rocket Company was an aerospace company in the late 1990s. Its founders were among the first to recognize that the end of the Cold War represented a significant shift away from the militarization of space, to a new civilian-led, commercial space industry. In 1996, Rotary Rocket Company was formed to address this emerging market. 

The company developed the Roton launch vehicle as a fully reusable single-stage-to-orbit (SSTO) piloted spacecraft.  The design was initially conceived by Bevin McKinney, who shared it with Gary Hudson. The Roton was intended to reduce costs of launching payloads into low earth orbit by a factor of ten.

Rotary attracted considerable media attention, as well as venture capital from angel investors and opened an engineering design and test center in a  facility at Mojave Air and Space Port in Mojave, California. The fuselage for their vehicles was made by Scaled Composites, at the same airport, while the company developed the novel engine design and rotary-wing landing system. A full-scale test vehicle made three flight tests in 1999, but the collapse in the satellite launch market led to the company's closure in early 2001.

The venture's origins 

Bevin McKinney had been thinking about the idea of a launch vehicle using helicopter blades for several years, when Wired magazine asked Gary Hudson to write an article on the concept. The resulting article led to a commitment of funding from billionaire Walt Anderson, which was combined with an initial investment from author Tom Clancy and allowed the company to get started. Hudson and McKinney were joined by co-founders Frederick Giarrusso, Dan DeLong, James Grote, Tom Brosz, and Anne Hudson, who together launched the company in October 1996.

Novel and open business model 

Founded and headquartered in Silicon Valley, from the beginning Rotary Rocket Company took a decidedly novel approach to the aerospace industry. 

As a result of the industry's origins in defense contracting, industry practice was to price launches on a "cost + fixed fee" basis; perhaps unsurprisingly, this had the tendency to drive costs higher, and made launch prices unpredictable for customers. Rotary took the somewhat radical approach of pricing its services based on the market, rather than based on its costs. It then tried to keep costs down in order to maximize potential profit.

The company relied entirely upon private financing, rather than government subsidies. And despite its innovative vehicle design, the company remained completely focused on its business mission. It argued that the government should purchase launch services from private companies, just as it did other services, rather than forcing private companies to purchase launches from the government or government contractors - a very radical idea for the time.

Similarly, at a time when the industry had very conservative hiring practices and was well-known for treating employees as commodities, the company made a point of hiring the best people it could find, regardless of background, and paying them well - including granting stock options to all employees, a practice which was unheard of at the time in the aerospace industry. It offered insurance benefits to the domestic partners of its LGBT employees a decade before the rest of the industry followed suit. And in a decidedly male-dominated industry, fully half of its management team were women.

Unlike most of the industry, which had grown out of the defense industry and thus operated in secret, Rotary Rocket Company was open and even invited public scrutiny - going so far as to allow a writer to "live with" the team, sitting in on meetings and interviewing members of staff at their discretion.

Roton design evolution

Initial concept 

Bevin McKinney's initial concept was to merge a launch vehicle with a helicopter: spinning rotor blades, powered by tip jets, would lift the vehicle in the earliest stage of launch. Once the air density thinned to the point that rotary-wing flight was impractical, the vehicle would continue its ascent on pure rocket power, with the rotor acting as a giant turbopump.

Calculations showed that the helicopter blades modestly increased the effective specific impulse (Isp) by approximately 20–30 seconds, effectively only carrying the blades into orbit "for free." Thus, there was no overall gain from this method during ascent. However, the blades could be used to soft land the vehicle, so its landing system carried no additional cost.

Research at Rotary found that once the vehicle left the atmosphere additional thrust would be necessary. Thus multiple engines would be needed at the base as well as at the rotor tips.

This initial version of the Roton had been designed with the small communications satellite market in mind. However, when this market crashed, signaled by the failure of Iridium Communications, the Roton concept needed to be redesigned for heavier payloads.

Revised design 

The revised and redesigned Roton concept was a cone-shaped launch vehicle, with a folded rotary wing on top for use only during landing. An internal cargo bay could be used both for carrying payloads to orbit and bringing others back to Earth. The projected price to orbit of this design was given as $1,000 per kg of payload, less than one-tenth of the then-current launch price. Payload capacity was limited to a relatively modest .

The revised version was to use a unique rotating annular aerospike engine: the engine and base of the launch vehicle would spin at high speed (720 rpm) to pump fuel and oxidizer to the rim by the rotation. Unlike the landing rotor, due to the shallow angle of the nozzles in the base rotor, the rotation speed self limited and required no control system. Since the density of the LOX (liquid oxygen) was higher than that of the kerosene, extra pressure was available with the LOX, so it would cool the engine's throat and other components, rather than using the kerosene as the coolant as in a conventional LOX/kerosene rocket. However, at the high G levels at the outer edge of the rotating engine block, clarity on how LOX would work as a coolant was both unknown and difficult to validate. That added one layer of risk.

In addition, the rotating exhaust acted as a wall at the outer edge of the engine base, lowering the temperature of the base to below ambient due to ejector pump effect and creating a suction cup at the bottom in atmosphere. This could be alleviated using makeup gas to develop base pressure, requiring an additional rocket engine to fill up the base of the main rocket engine. (Similar problems would have occurred in a conventional aerospike engine, but there, natural recirculation plus use of the turbopump gas-generator's exhaust as the makeup gas would have largely alleviated the problem "for free.")

At the rim, 96 miniature jets would exhaust the burning propellants (LOX and kerosene) around the rim of the base of the vehicle, which gained the vehicle extra thrust at high altitude – acting as a zero-length truncated aerospike nozzle. A similar system with non-rotating engines was studied for the N1 rocket. That application had a much smaller base area, and did not create the suction effect a larger peripheral engine induces. The Roton engine had a projected vacuum ISP (specific impulse) of ~, which is very high for a LOX/kerosene engine –and a thrust to weight ratio of 150, which is extremely light.

During reentry, the base also served as a water-cooled heatshield. This was theoretically a good way to survive reentry, particularly for a lightweight reusable vehicle. However, using water as a coolant would require converting it into superheated steam, at high temperatures and pressures, and there were concerns about micrometeorite damage on orbit puncturing the pressure vessel, causing the reentry shield to fail. These concerns were resolved using a failure-resistant massively redundant flow system, created using thin metal sheets chemically etched with a pattern of micropores forming a channel system that was robust against failure and damage.

In addition, cooling was achieved two different ways; one way was the vaporization of the water, but the second was even more significant, and was due to the creation of a layer of "cool" steam surrounding the base surface, reducing the ability to heat. Further, the water metering system would have to be extremely reliable, giving one drop per second per square inch, and was achieved via a trial/error design approach on real hardware. By the end of the Roton program, some hardware had been built and tested. The reentry trajectory was to be trimmed, similar to the Soyuz, to minimize the G loads on the passengers. And the ballistic coefficient was better for the Roton and could be better tailored. When the Soyuz trim system failed and it went full ballistic, the G levels did rise significantly but without incident to the passengers.

The vehicle was also unique in planning to use its rotary wing for landing, rather than fixed wings or parachutes. This concept allowed controlled landings (unlike parachutes), and it was 1/5 the weight of fixed wings. Another advantage was that a rotary aircraft could land almost anywhere, whereas winged spaceplanes such as the Space Shuttle had to make it back to the runway to land safely. The rotor blades were to be deployed before reentry and powered by peroxide tip rockets.

The initial plan was to have them almost vertical, but that was found to be unstable as they needed to drop lower and lower and spin faster for stability, the heating rates went up dramatically and the air flow became more head on. The implication of that was that the blades went from a lightly heated piece of hardware to one that either had to be actively cooled or made of SiC or other refractory material. The idea of popping out the blades became much more attractive at this point, and initial studies were made for that option. This rotor design concept was not without precedent. In 1955, one of five Soviet designs for planned suborbital piloted missions was to include rocket-tipped rotors as its landing system. On May 1, 1958 these plans were dropped as a decision was made to proceed directly to orbital flights.

Rotary Rocket designed and pressure-tested an exceptionally lightweight but strong composite LOX tank. It survived a test program which involved it being pressure cycled and ultimately deliberately shot to test its ignition sensitivity.

A new engine 

In June 1999, Rotary Rocket announced that it would use a derivative of the Fastrac engine under development at NASA's Marshall Space Flight Center, instead of the company's own unconventional spinning engine design. Reportedly, the company had been unable to convince investors that its engine design was viable; the composite structure and gyrocopter reentry was an easier sell.

At this point, the company planned to begin its commercial launch service sometime in 2001.

The Atmospheric Test Vehicle (ATV) 

A full size, 63 ft (19 m) tall, Atmospheric Test Vehicle (ATV) was built under contract by Scaled Composites for use in hover flight tests. The $2.8 million ATV was not intended as an all-up test article, since it had no rocket engine and no heat shielding. The ATV was rolled out of its Mojave hangar on March 1, 1999, bearing an FAA registry of N990RR.

The rotor head for this test vehicle was salvaged from a Sikorsky S-58, at a price of $50,000 – as opposed to as much as $1 million for a new head. Each rotor was powered by a 350-lbf (1,560 N) hydrogen peroxide tip jet, as intended for the orbital vehicle. The rotor assemblage was tested in a rock quarry before installation on the ATV.

The ATV flew three successful test flights in 1999. The pilot for these three flights was Marti Sarigul-Klijn and the copilot was Brian Binnie (who later gained fame as pilot of Scaled Composites' SpaceShipOne on its second X-Prize flight).

The ATV made its first flight on July 28. This flight consisted of three vertical hops totaling 4 min 40 sec in duration and reaching a maximum altitude of 8 ft (2.4 m). The pilots found flying extremely challenging for a number of reasons. Visibility in the cockpit was so restricted that the pilots nicknamed it the Batcave. The view of the ground was entirely obstructed, so the pilots had to rely on a sonar altimeter to judge ground proximity. The entire craft had a low rotational inertia, and torque from the spinning rotor blades made the body spin, unless counteracted by yaw thrust in the opposite direction.

The second flight, on September 16, was a continuous hover flight lasting 2 min 30 sec, reaching a maximum altitude of 20 ft (6.1 m). The sustained flight was made possible by the installation of more powerful rotor tip thrusters and an autothrottle.

The third and last flight was made on October 12. The ATV flew down the flightline at Mojave Air and Space Port, covering 4,300 ft (1,310 m) in its flight and rising to a maximum altitude of 75 ft (23 m). The speed was as high as 53 mph (85 km/h). This test revealed some instability in translational flight.

A fourth test was planned to simulate a full autorotative descent. The ATV would climb to an altitude 10,000 ft (3,050 m) under its own power, before throttling back and returning for a soft landing. However, this test was not performed.

Roton C-9 specifications

Future refinement of the design 

The Roton flew three test flights and a composite propellant tank survived a full test program. However, as with all test programs, these tests revealed challenges that required iteration. For example, the Atmospheric Test Vehicle demonstrated that landing the Roton was difficult. Unfortunately, later versions of this initial Roton vehicle were never built, which might have allowed the design to be refined.

Other aspects of the flight plan remained unproven, including whether Roton could have developed sufficient performance to reach orbit with a single stage and return – although on paper this was clearly possible.

The company's last days 
Rotary Rocket ceased engine development in 2000, reportedly two weeks before a full-scale test was due, and the company closed in 2001.

The timing of the venture was unfortunate: the Iridium Communications venture was nearing bankruptcy, and the space industry in general was experiencing financial stress. Ultimately, the collapse of the satellite launch market prevented the company from securing the contracts it needed to be viable.

The Atmospheric Test Vehicle was to be displayed at Classic Rotors Museum near San Diego, California. However, the Mojave Airport administration worked to keep this historic vehicle at Mojave, and on November 10, 2006, the Roton was moved to its permanent display location at the intersection of Airport Blvd and Sabovich Road. 

The Rotary Rocket hangars are now occupied by the National Test Pilot School.

Rotary Rocket's legacy 

To many, Rotary Rocket Company represented the first major step toward private commercial spaceflight, and certainly launched Mojave into the Space Age as the world's first civilian Space Port. This theme was echoed at the dedication ceremony that took place during the Veterans' Day celebration on November 11, at which Brian Binnie was the keynote speaker.

As with all new ventures, particularly ones of Rotary’s magnitude, the founders and investors understood it was a long shot. But they also hoped to galvanize public opinion, elevate market understanding of the significance of commercial space, and ultimately inspire a new breed of space entrepreneurs and investors - including Richard Branson, Jeff Bezos, and Paul Allen.

Some of the people who worked at Rotary Rocket went on to set up other aerospace ventures, notably XCOR Aerospace, t/Space and Space Launch. Brian Binnie joined Scaled Composites where, on October 4, 2004, he piloted SpaceShipOne's second, Ansari X Prize-winning flight. The X Prize itself was funded using an unconventional funding model developed and introduced by Rotary Rocket's finance team. Indeed, the very term "NewSpace" was coined to describe Rotary Rocket's singular approach to the business.

The novel business model Rotary Rocket pioneered, and its emphasis on civilian space endeavors, has since been replicated by virtually every company in the space industry, around the world. And the government now buys its launches from the private sector - at a fixed price.

Viewed in this light, Rotary Rocket Company was one of the most important steps in humankind’s ascension to commercial space.

See also 
 Hiller Hornet, a helicopter with ramjets mounted on the rotor blade tips.

References 

 Citations

 Bibliography

 Petit, Charles, "Rockets for the Rest of Us." Air&Space/Smithsonian Magazine, March, 1998. A look at the early design of Rotary Rocket.
 Sarigul-Klijn, Marti, "I Survived the Rotary Rocket." Air&Space/Smithsonian Magazine, March, 2002. The test pilot of the ATV describes the three test flights.
 Weil, Elizabeth, They All Laughed At Christopher Columbus: An Incurable Dreamer Builds the First Civilian Spaceship. Bantam, 2003. An insider's view of the development of Rotary Rocket.

External links 

 Roton article at Encyclopedia Astronautica
 Gary C. Hudson, Insanely Great? or Just Plain Insane? - Wired magazine article on Roton, May 1996
 Space.com on test flights; archived copy
 Space.com on helicopter museum trip
 QuickTime footage of final test flight of Roton ATV, from the Air&Space Magazine website
 Archives of original rotaryrocket.com website, from Internet Archive Wayback Machine
 Tom Brosz's personal account of Rotary Rocket and fallout
 Roton C-9 specs
 Photos of the project from the Mojave Virtual Museum
 Photos from the unveiling of the Roton 

Mojave Air and Space Port
Rotorcraft
Private spaceflight companies
Commercial spaceflight
Spaceplanes
Single-stage-to-orbit
Proposed reusable launch systems
Rocket-powered aircraft
Space access
Scaled Composites
VTVL rockets
Cancelled spacecraft
Cancelled space launch vehicles
Defunct spaceflight companies